The 2022 season was the Denver Broncos' 53rd in the National Football League (NFL), their 63rd overall, their second under the leadership of general manager George Paton, and their first and only season under head coach Nathaniel Hackett. This was also their first season under the ownership of the Walton-Penner Family Group, replacing the Pat Bowlen Trust that had existed following the death of longtime owner Pat Bowlen in 2019.

The Broncos hoped to improve on their 7–10 record from 2021 and make the playoffs for the first time since 2015, as they made a blockbuster trade to land former Seattle Seahawks' quarterback Russell Wilson. The team's defense ranked near the top in several categories; however, injuries, poor offensive performances and numerous penalties plagued the team, ranking at or near the bottom of the league in several offensive categories, including last in scoring. The Broncos did not score 30 or more points until their final game of the season. The Broncos suffered their sixth consecutive losing season and missed the playoffs for the seventh straight season. Hackett was fired on December 26, two weeks before the end of the season, after a 4–11 start. The Broncos finished their disastrous season with a 5–12 record, tying a franchise record for losses in a season, with a 4–12 record that was previously set in 2010. The poor Broncos also finished the season with 22 players on injured reserve, the second most in the league.

Coincidentally, the Broncos, who lost to the Seahawks in their 2022 season opener, tied a franchise record for losses that was set in 2010, where the they got their first win, by beating the Seahawks.

Coaching changes
On January 9, one day after the Broncos' 2021 regular season finale, head coach Vic Fangio was fired after compiling a  record in three seasons and two consecutive last-place finishes.  On January 27, the Broncos finalized a deal for Nathaniel Hackett to become the 18th head coach in the franchise's history, replacing Fangio. This will be Hackett's first head coaching job, after previously serving as the Buffalo Bills' offensive coordinator from 2013 to 2014, the Jacksonville Jaguars' quarterbacks coach/offensive coordinator from 2015 to 2018 and the Green Bay Packers' offensive coordinator from 2019 to 2021. Hackett becomes the Broncos' sixth different head coach since 2008.

In the one month after Hackett's hiring, the Broncos underwent the following coaching changes:

Note: Bill Kollar remained on the Broncos' coaching staff as a defensive consultant.

In-season
On December 26, one day after an embarrassing 51–14 loss to the Los Angeles Rams, and as a result of the team's offensive struggles, head coach Nathaniel Hackett was fired after a 4–11 start. Jerry Rosburg, who was hired in Week 3 to assist Hackett following a series of game management errors in the team's first two games, was named the team's interim coach for the last two games of the season. Rosburg served as the Baltimore Ravens' special teams coach from 2008–2018. Hackett became the fifth head coach in NFL history to not last a full season, and his tenure was the shortest for a non-interim coach in franchise history. That same day, offensive line coach Butch Barry and special teams coach Dwayne Stukes, both in their first season with the Broncos, were also fired.

Front office changes
On February 3, Darren Mougey, who served as the Broncos' Director of Player Personnel in 2021, was promoted to assistant general manager. Mougey previously served as a Broncos' scouting assistant from 2012 to 2020.

Roster changes

Future contracts
All players listed below were signed to reserve/future contracts from January 10–12, unless noted otherwise. Each player was officially added to the active roster on March 16—the first day of the 2022 league year.

Free agents

Unrestricted

Note: Unrestricted free agents who were originally Restricted free agents (RFA) had three accrued seasons whose contracts expired at the end of the previous season, and did not receive a qualifying offer before the start of the 2022 league year on March 16.

Restricted and exclusive-rights

Signings

Departures

Draft

Draft trades

Post-draft trades
 August 30: The Broncos traded linebacker Malik Reed and a 2023 seventh-round selection to the Pittsburgh Steelers in exchange for a 2023 sixth-round selection.
 November 1: The Broncos made two separate trades prior to the trade deadline: First, linebacker Bradley Chubb was traded to the Miami Dolphins, along with a 2025 fifth-round selection, in exchange for running back Chase Edmonds, a 2023 first-round selection and a 2024 fourth-round selection. Then, the Broncos acquired linebacker Jacob Martin and a 2024 fifth-round selection in a trade that sent their 2024 fourth-round selection to the New York Jets. Edmonds was later placed on injured reserve on November 21, and activated on December 24.

Undrafted free agents
All undrafted free agents were signed at the conclusion of the 2022 NFL Draft on April 30, unless noted otherwise.

Trade for Russell Wilson
On March 16, the Broncos acquired quarterback Russell Wilson and a 2022 fourth-round selection (No. 116 overall) from the Seattle Seahawks, in one of the largest trades in NFL history. The Broncos sent quarterback Drew Lock, tight end Noah Fant, defensive end Shelby Harris, their 2022 first-, second- and fifth-round selections (Nos. 9, 40 and 145 overall) and their 2023 first- and second-round selections to the Seahawks in exchange. In his ten seasons in Seattle (2012–2021), Wilson reached nine Pro Bowls, led the Seahawks to eight playoff appearances and two Super Bowl berths, including a 43–8 victory over the Broncos in Super Bowl XLVIII. Wilson became the Broncos' 12th different starting quarterback since Peyton Manning's retirement after their 2015 Super Bowl-winning season—tied with the Washington Commanders for the most in the NFL during that span.

Injuries

Staff

Final roster

Preseason

Regular season

Schedule

Note: Intra-division opponents are in bold text.

Game summaries

Week 1: at Seattle Seahawks

The 2022 season opener marked Russell Wilson's return to Seattle, where he led the Seahawks to eight playoff appearances and two Super Bowl berths during his ten seasons in Seattle from 2012–2021. After his trade from the Seahawks to the Broncos in March, he became the Broncos' sixth different opening day starting quarterback in as many seasons. This also marked Nathaniel Hackett's debut as the Broncos' head coach.

Each team alternated scoring plays in the first half. The Seahawks took the early lead on the game's opening drive, with quarterback Geno Smith connecting on a 38-yard touchdown pass to tight end Will Dissly in the first quarter. Placekicker Brandon McManus got the Broncos on the scoring board with a 30-yard field goal. The Seahawks increased their lead to 10–3 midway through the second quarter with a 49-yard field goal. The Broncos then pulled even with the Seahawks, when Wilson threw his first touchdown pass as a Bronco—a 67-yarder to wide receiver Jerry Jeudy. However, the Seahawks responded, with Smith's second touchdown of the first half—a 25-yarder to tight end Colby Parkinson prior to the 2-minute warning. The Broncos' defense held the Seahawks scoreless for the remainder of the game. McManus added a 30-yard field goal as time expired in the first half to narrow the Seahawks' lead to 17–13.

The Broncos had the ball on the 1-yard line on back-to-back drives in the third quarter, but suffered two very costly turnovers when running backs Melvin Gordon and Javonte Williams fumbled on the goal line on consecutive possessions. In between the two goal line fumbles, Broncos' linebacker Randy Gregory forced a fumble off Seahawks' wide receiver D. K. Metcalf near midfield and a recovery by safety Justin Simmons. After a scoreless third quarter, the Broncos started their first possession of the fourth quarter with 12:50 remaining in the game, but failed to reach the end zone after a 1st-and goal at the 3-yard line. McManus kicked a 26-yard field goal to narrow the Seahawks' lead to 17–16 at the 6:16 mark of the fourth quarter. After the defense forced a three-and-out from the Seahawks' offense, the Broncos started their final drive at their own 22-yard line with 4:02 remaining in the game. Wilson marched the Broncos down the field and faced a 4th-and-5 on the Seahawks' 46-yard line with 56 seconds to play. Instead of calling a timeout, Hackett decided to let the clock run down to 20 seconds and called his first timeout to send out placekicker Brandon McManus to try a 64-yard game-winning field goal, which he missed wide left, sealing the win for the Seahawks. Hackett's decision to burn over 40 seconds of game clock to kick a 64-yard field goal instead of letting the offense try to convert and move the ball further down the field was widely criticized. The Broncos' offense failed to reach the end zone on all three of their red zone trips.

Week 2: vs. Houston Texans
{{Americanfootballbox
|titlestyle=;text-align:center;
|state=autocollapse
|title=Week 2: Houston Texans at Denver Broncos – Game summary
|date=September 18
|time=2:25 p.m. MDT
|road=Texans
|R1=3|R2=3|R3=3|R4=0
|home=Broncos
|H1=3|H2=3|H3=0|H4=10
|stadium=Empower Field at Mile High, Denver, Colorado
|attendance=76,191
|weather=Sunny, 
|referee=Carl Cheffers
|TV=CBS
|TVAnnouncers=Andrew Catalon, James Lofton and Michael Grady
|reference=Recap, Game Book
|scoring=
First quarter
DEN – Brandon McManus 20-yard field goal, 5:30. Broncos 3–0. Drive: 8 plays, 63 yards, 2:18.
HOU – Ka'imi Fairbairn 40-yard field goal, 2:19. Tied 3–3. Drive: 10 plays, 54 yards, 3:11.
Second quarter
HOU – Ka'imi Fairbairn 44-yard field goal, 7:20. Texans 6–3. Drive: 10 plays, 54 yards, 5:32.
DEN – Brandon McManus 24-yard field goal, 0:20. Tied 6–6. Drive: 9 plays, 70 yards, 3:44.
Third quarter
HOU – Ka'imi Fairbairn 24-yard field goal, 8:33. Texans 9–6. Drive: 11 plays, 39 yards, 5:09.
Fourth quarter
DEN – Eric Saubert 22-yard pass from Russell Wilson (Brandon McManus kick), 12:37. Broncos 13–9. Drive: 6 plays, 62 yards, 3:56.
DEN – Brandon McManus 50-yard field goal, 3:36. Broncos 16–9. Drive: 12 plays, 54 yards, 6:12.''|stats=Top passersHOU – Davis Mills – 19/38, 177 yards
DEN – Russell Wilson – 14/31, 219 yards, TD, INTTop rushersHOU – Dameon Pierce – 15 rushes, 69 yards
DEN – Javonte Williams – 15 rushes, 75 yardsTop receiversHOU – Nico Collins – 4 receptions, 58 yards
DEN – Courtland Sutton – 7 receptions, 122 yards
}}
Through the midway point of the third quarter, all of the scoring came courtesy of the placekickers—40-, 44- and 24-yard field goals by the Texans' Ka'imi Fairbairn, and 24- and 50-yard field goals by the Broncos' Brandon McManus. The 24-yard field goal by Fairbairn occurred after an interception of Broncos' quarterback Russell Wilson on the first possession of the first half. The Broncos took the lead for good early in the fourth quarter, with Wilson connecting on a 22-yard touchdown pass to tight end Eric Saubert—the game's only touchdown. After forcing a Texans' punt, McManus added a 50-yard field goal with 3:36 remaining in the game. The Broncos' defense forced two Texans' turnovers on downs, ending their rally attempt, and in the process, held the Texans to 234 total yards, helping Nathaniel Hackett earning his first win as Broncos head coach.

Week 3: vs. San Francisco 49ers

The Broncos' offense had ten drives that ended in a 3-and-out, but their defense stymied the 49ers throughout the entire game. The only scoring plays within the first quarter were a 3-yard touchdown pass from 49ers' quarterback Jimmy Garoppolo to wide receiver Brandon Aiyuk in the first quarter, and a 55-yard field goal by Broncos' placekicker Brandon McManus early in the second quarter. After the Broncos went 3-and-out on their first two possessions of the third quarter, the 49ers were backed up near their own goal line. Garoppolo accidentally stepped out of the back of the end zone for a safety while being pressured by Broncos' nose tackle Mike Purcell—a play which proved critical to the game's outcome. The Broncos trailed 10–5 following a 51-yard field goal by 49ers' placekicker Robbie Gould early in the 4th quarter, but finally found their rhythm on a 12-play, 80-yard drive, which running back Melvin Gordon capped off with a 1-yard touchdown run. While they failed to convert the 2-point conversion, they took an 11–10 lead with 4:13 remaining in the game. The Broncos' defense then forced two game-saving turnovers. First, Garoppolo was intercepted by linebacker Jonas Griffith, following a deflection by cornerback Kareem Jackson. Then, after the Broncos went 3-and-out just after the two-minute warning, and in the process, forcing the 49ers to burn two of their team timeouts, safety P. J. Locke forced a fumble off 49ers' running back Jeff Wilson deep in 49ers' territory, with Jackson recovering the fumble to seal the Broncos' victory.

Week 4: at Las Vegas Raiders

After a 30-yard field goal by Raiders' placekicker Daniel Carlson early in the first quarter, the Broncos responded, with a 5-yard touchdown pass from quarterback Russell Wilson to wide receiver Courtland Sutton. It would be their only lead of the game, as a 5-yard touchdown run by running back Josh Jacobs early in the second quarter gave the Raiders the lead. Like the previous three games, red zone struggles continued to plague the Broncos, as they were forced to settle on a 28-yard field goal by placekicker Brandon McManus to tie the game at 10–10. After forcing a Raiders' punt on a 3-and-out, disaster struck on the Broncos' next possession just as they were hoping to re-take the lead. Running back Melvin Gordon fumbled, and Raiders' cornerback Amik Robertson recovered the football, returning it for a 68-yard touchdown (with a missed extra point attempt). The Broncos pulled even with the Raiders, with a 5-play, 75-yard drive, culminating in a 20-yard touchdown pass from Wilson to wide receiver Jerry Jeudy. McManus missed short on the extra-point attempt that would have given the Broncos the lead. The Raiders then drove down the field that resulted in a 39-yard field goal by Carlson for a 19–16 lead just before halftime. A 22-yard field goal by Carlson was the only scoring play of the third quarter. The Broncos' running game struggled after running back Javonte Williams was forced to leave the game with, what turned out to be, a season-ending knee injury. After the Broncos went 3-and-out on the first possession of the fourth quarter, Carlson's fourth field goal of the game—from 30 yards out, gave the Raiders a 25–16 lead. The Broncos drove down the field, culminating a 3-yard rushing touchdown by Wilson to narrow the Raiders' lead to 25–23 with 7:19 remaining in the game. The drive was aided by a 55-yard completion from Wilson to wide receiver K. J. Hamler to the Raiders' 3-yard line, after two holding penalties backed up the Broncos with a 1st-and-30 from their own 19-yard line. However, the Broncos' defense was unable to hold the Raiders a pair of 3rd-down conversions. Carr scrambled for 9 yards on a critical 3-and-6 for a first down, and backup running back Zamir White scrambled for 22 yards on a 3rd-and-2 from the Broncos' 29-yard line. On the next play, Jacobs rushed for a 7-yard game-clinching touchdown. Wilson rushed for 5 yards on their first play from scrimmage just before the 2-minute warning, then threw three straight incomplete passes to end the Broncos' rally attempt.

Week 5: vs. Indianapolis Colts

All of the scoring came by way of the placekickers—Brandon McManus (Broncos) and Chase McLaughlin (Colts). McManus gave the Broncos a 6–0 lead with a 33-yarder in the first quarter, followed by a 44-yarder early in the second quarter. McLaughlin got the Colts on the board just before the halftime, with a 52-yard field goal, then pulled the Colts even with the Broncos, with a 51-yarder midway through the third quarter. McManus' third attempt of the game—from 34 yards out—was blocked by Colts' defensive tackle Grover Stewart—a play that would prove to be critical to the game's outcome. Following an interception of Colts' quarterback Matt Ryan by safety Caden Sterns, McManus redeemed himself with a 45-yarder late in the third quarter. The Broncos advanced into field goal range early in the fourth quarter; however, they blew a chance to add to their lead, when quarterback Russell Wilson was intercepted by Colts' safety Rodney Thomas II near the goal line. The Broncos' defense was able to stop the Colts from advancing past midfield on this possession and the next. The Broncos held a 9–6 lead with 6:47 remaining in the game, and marched down the field, hoping to either add to their lead or run out the clock. Wilson completed a 9-yard pass to tight end Eric Saubert, after facing a 4th-and-1 at the Colts' 28-yard line, forcing the Colts to use all of their team timeouts on defense. However, three plays later, Wilson was intercepted by Colts' cornerback Stephon Gilmore in the end zone for a touchback, on a pass intended for wide receiver Tyrie Cleveland. With 2:19 remaining in the fourth quarter, the Colts marched down the field, and McLaughlin sent the game to overtime with a 31-yard field goal. The Colts won the overtime coin toss, and grabbed a 12–9 lead, with McLaughlin's fourth field goal, from 48 yards out midway through overtime. The Broncos reached the Colts' 5-yard line in only six plays, and faced a 4th-and-1. However, instead of tying the game, they decided to either go for a new set of downs of try to win with a touchdown. However, Wilson's pass intended for wide receiver Courtland Sutton was broken up by Gilmore, resulting in a gut-wrenching loss for the Broncos. Wilson missed a wide-open K. J. Hamler on the game's final play. It was later revealed that Wilson had playing with a partially torn lat in his throwing shoulder since the second quarter of the Broncos' previous game against the Raiders.

Week 6: at Los Angeles Chargers

Yet another stellar effort by the Broncos' defense was wasted by a poor performance from their offense. A 51-yard field goal by placekicker Brandon McManus, followed by a 39-yard touchdown pass from quarterback Russell Wilson to rookie tight end Greg Dulcich gave the Broncos a 10–0 lead in the first quarter. However, the offense struggled through the remainder of the game. The Chargers responded in the second quarter, with a 6-yard touchdown run by running back Austin Ekeler and a 37-yard field goal by placekicker Dustin Hopkins. A 27-yard field goal by McManus gave the Broncos a 13–10 lead at halftime. After the Broncos went 3-and-out on the opening opening possession of the second half, Hopkins tied the game with a 31-yard field goal. The Chargers faced a 4th-and-2 at the Broncos' 29-yard line; however, the Broncos' defense came up with a stop, forcing an incomplete pass off Chargers' quarterback Justin Herbert. On the Chargers' next possession, Herbert was intercepted by linebacker Baron Browning, giving the Broncos good field position at the Chargers' 30-yard line. However, the Broncos failed to gain any yardage, and McManus kicked a 47-yard field goal to give the Broncos a 16–13 lead midway through the fourth quarter. The Chargers responded once again, and Hopkins' third field goal of the game—from 35 yards out, tied the game at 16–16 with 4:02 remaining in the fourth quarter. Neither team advanced past midfield, sending the game to overtime.
The Broncos went 3-and-out on both of their overtime possessions, and Hopkins later kicked the game-winning 43-yard field goal. Wilson threw for 188 yards, but 173 of those came in the first half, and Wilson played through a hamstring injury during the second half.

Week 7: vs. New York Jets

The Broncos fell behind early, after Jets' running back Breece Hall ran for a 62-yard touchdown. The Broncos responded late in the first quarter, with a 2-yard run by running back Latavius Murray. However, placekicker Brandon McManus missed wide-right on the extra point attempt, and again on a 56-yard field goal attempt early in the second quarter. McManus later atoned for his missed kicks, with a 44-yard field goal to give the Broncos their only lead of the game, at 10–9. However, the Broncos were held scoreless for the remainder of the game, and the Jets took the lead for good, with a 45-yard field goal by placekicker Greg Zuerlein at the end of the first half. Quarterback Brett Rypien, starting in place of the injured Russell Wilson, was intercepted by Jets' safety Lamarcus Joyner, resulting in the Jets adding to their lead, with a 33-yard field goal by Zuerlein early in the fourth quarter. After the Broncos went 3-and-out, the Jets increased their lead to 16–9, with a 40-yard field goal by Zuerlein with 4:39 remaining in the game. The Broncos faced a 4th-and-3 at the Jets' 25-yard line at the two-minute warning, but Rypien's deep pass intended for wide receiver Courtland Sutton was incomplete. The Broncos' defense forced a 3-and-out from the Jets, and had one last offensive possession with 1:30 remaining in the game, but turned the football over on downs after two first downs and reaching midfield.

Week 8: at Jacksonville JaguarsNFL London gamesThis was the Broncos' second appearance in the International Series in London—the other occurred in 2010. After quarterback Russell Wilson was intercepted on the Broncos' second possession, the Jaguars capitalized, with quarterback Trevor Lawrence throwing a 22-yard touchdown pass to tight end Evan Engram. The Jaguars were attempting to add to lead, with a 1st-and-goal, but Broncos' safety Justin Simmons intercepted a pass in the end zone from Lawrence intended for wide receiver Marvin Jones. The Jaguars eventually added to their lead on their next possession, with a 37-yard field goal by placekicker Riley Patterson. The Broncos finally got on the scoreboard late in the first half, with Wilson connecting with wide receiver Jerry Jeudy on a 6-yard touchdown pass, and later took the lead in the third quarter, with running back Melvin Gordon rushing for a 1-yard touchdown. Following several punt exchanges, the Jaguars took a 17–14 lead, with running back Travis Etienne rushing for a 1-yard touchdown. With 3:54 remaining in the game, Wilson engineered a fourth quarter comeback, culminating in a 2-yard touchdown run by running Latavius Murray with 1:47 remaining. After a touchback on the kickoff, the Broncos' defense subdued the Jaguars' rally attempt, as Lawrence was intercepted by cornerback K'Waun Williams on the first play from scrimmage.

Week 10: at Tennessee Titans

The Broncos' entire scoring output occurred in the second quarter—a 66-yard touchdown pass from quarterback Russell Wilson to wide receiver Jalen Virgil, along with a 39-yard field goal by placekicker Brandon McManus. The Titans got on the scoreboard just before halftime, with quarterback Ryan Tannehill connecting on a 9-yard touchdown pass to wide receiver Nick Westbrook-Ikhine in the corner of the end zone. The Titans grabbed the lead in the third quarter, with Tannehill throwing a 63-yard touchdown pass to Westbrook-Ikhine by way of a flea-flicker. A 35-yard field goal by placekicker Randy Bullock increased the Titans' lead to 17–10 with three minutes remaining in the fourth quarter. The Broncos' punted on their first five possessions of the second half, failing to advance past their own 42-yard line on four possessions. Wilson tried to engineer a rally, and the Broncos faced a 4th-and-8 at the Titans' 25 line with 20 seconds remaining. However, Wilson was intercepted by Titans' cornerback Terrance Mitchell near the goal line, ending the Broncos' rally attempt.

Week 11: vs. Las Vegas Raiders

The Broncos reached the end zone on their opening possession, with a 1-yard touchdown run by running back Latavius Murray, and placekicker Brandon McManus gave the Broncos a 10–0 lead, with a 48-yard field goal early in the second quarter. In between, Raiders' placekicker Daniel Carlson missed wide right on a 46-yard field goal attempt, but a 31-yard touchdown pass from quarterback Derek Carr to wide receiver Davante Adams put the Raiders on the scoreboard. The Broncos marched down the field, and were attempting to add to their lead just before halftime; however, McManus' field goal attempt from 25 yards out was blocked by Raiders' defensive end Maxx Crosby. After the Broncos' went three-and-out to begin the second half, a 52-yard field goal by Carlson tied the game at 10–10. After an exchange of punts, McManus countered with a 52-yard field goal of his own at the beginning of the fourth quarter. Each team went three-and-out on their next offensive possessions, and a 57-yard field goal by Carlson tied the game at 13–13. McManus responded, with a 48-yard field goal to give the Broncos a 16–13 lead with 3:34 remaining in the game. After a forcing a three-and-out, the Broncos were attempting to run out the clock, but only earned one first down and were forced to punt just after the two-minute warning. The Broncos' defense was unable to stop the Raiders, as Carlson kicked a 25-yard field goal to send the game to overtime tied a 16–16. The Raiders' game-tying drive was aided by two deep pass completions from Carr—a 21-yarder to wide receiver Keelan Cole, and from midfield, a 43-yarder to running back Josh Jacobs. The Raiders won the overtime coin toss, and on the third play from scrimmage, Carr threw the game-winning 35-yard touchdown pass to Adams.

Week 12: at Carolina Panthers

The Broncos' struggled offensively throughout the entire game, in a 23–10 loss to the Panthers. The Broncos trailed 23–3 midway through the fourth quarter, and failed to advance past their own 38-yard line in seven of their first ten possessions. The only scoring play came by way of a 27-yard field goal by placekicker Brandon McManus early in the second quarter, after a Panthers' fumble on a punt return. In the other two possessions in which the Broncos' found themselves past midfield, quarterback Russell Wilson was strip-sacked after reaching the Panthers' 23-yard line, and McManus missed wide left on a 56-yard field goal attempt at the end of the first half. The Broncos finally reached the end zone at the 3:24 mark of the fourth quarter, with Wilson throwing a 1-yard touchdown pass to undrafted rookie wide receiver Brandon Johnson. The Broncos' subsequent onside kick attempt was unsuccessful. Defensively, the Broncos surrendered two touchdowns to Panthers' quarterback Sam Darnold—one passing and one rushing, as well as three field goals by placekicker Eddy Piñeiro.

Week 13: at Baltimore Ravens

The Broncos failed to score a touchdown for the third time in 2022, settling for three field goals by placekicker Brandon McManus, going 2-of-12 on third down and never advancing any further than the Ravens' 23-yard line. The Broncos led 9–3 with five minutes remaining in the fourth quarter. The scoring play that the Broncos' defense had yielded to that point was a 26-yard field goal by Ravens' placekicker Justin Tucker in the second quarter. However, the Broncos' defense failed to protect the lead, and Ravens' backup quarterback Tyler Huntley engineered a 16-play, 91-yard game-winning drive, culminating in a 2-yard touchdown run. Huntley entered the game after starting quarterback Lamar Jackson exited with a knee injury in the first half. With 28 seconds left in the game, quarterback Russell Wilson tried to put the Broncos in position for a game-winning field goal. After a 16-yard pass completion to wide receiver Jerry Jeudy and two runs of 17 and 4 yards by Wilson, the Broncos reached the Ravens' 45-yard line with two seconds remaining after exhausting the last two of their three team timeouts. McManus attempted a long field goal from 63 yards out, but it fell short.NotesWith the loss, the Broncos dropped to 1–7 all-time in Baltimore, including the postseason.

Week 14: vs. Kansas City Chiefs

The Broncos fell behind 27–0 to the Chiefs, following two field goals by placekicker Harrison Butker in the first quarter, two touchdown passes from quarterback Patrick Mahomes to running back Jerick McKinnon and a 47-yard interception of Broncos' quarterback Russell Wilson by cornerback Willie Gay for a touchdown. The Broncos took advantage of two interceptions by Mahomes, and within the last two minutes of the first half, Wilson threw a pair of touchdown passes to wide receiver Jerry Jeudy—from 18 and 5 yards out. The Broncos took the opening possession of the second half, and narrowed the Chiefs' lead to 27–21, with Wilson's third touchdown pass of the game—a 66-yarder to running back Marlon Mack. Following an exchange of punts, the Chiefs increased their lead to 34–21, with Mahomes' third touchdown pass of the game—a 4-yarder to wide receiver JuJu Smith-Schuster near the end of the third quarter. While the Broncos drove down the field on their next possession, Wilson suffered a concussion after a 14-yard scramble to the Chiefs' 2-yard line. Backup quarterback Brett Rypien took over for the remainder of the game, and on the same drive, he connected with Jeudy on a 7-yard touchdown pass— Jeudy's third touchdown reception of the game—to pull the Broncos within a 34–28 deficit. With six minutes remaining in the game, Mahomes was intercepted by linebacker Josey Jewell. However, just as the Broncos were hoping for a miraculous comeback from a 27–0 deficit, they failed to capitalize, as Rypien was intercepted three plays later by cornerback L'Jarius Sneed at the Chiefs' 24-yard line at the 4:34 mark of the fourth quarter. The Broncos' defense was unable to prevent the Chiefs' from running out the clock.

Week 15: vs. Arizona Cardinals

By the 9-minute mark of the third quarter, all of the scoring came by way of field goals. Broncos' placekicker Brandon McManus made a 52-yard field goal, but missed wide right on a 38-yard attempt—both in the first quarter, and the latter after an interception of Cardinals' quarterback Colt McCoy by safety Justin Simmons. McCoy started in place of Kyler Murray, who suffered a season-ending knee injury during the previous week. Cardinals' placekicker Matt Prater kicked three field goals—from 45 and 50 yards out in the second quarter, followed by a 55-yarder on the initial possession of the second half. McCoy was placed in concussion protocol after the third play from scrimmage of the second half, and was replaced by third-string quarterback Trace McSorley. Trailing 9–3, Broncos' backup quarterback Brett Rypien, starting in place of Russell Wilson, led a  7-play, 80-yard drive, culminating in a 3-yard touchdown run by running back Marlon Mack midway through the third quarter, which gave the Broncos the lead for good. Wilson was cleared from concussion protocol two days earlier, but did not play. Despite an interception of Rypien deep in Cardinals' territory at the end of the third quarter, the Broncos later added two more touchdowns in the fourth quarter—a 10-yard run by running back Latavius Murray, followed by a 3-yard pass from Rypien to tight end Eric Tomlinson. The Cardinals finally reached the end zone on their next possession, with running back James Conner rushing for a 1-yard touchdown to narrow the Broncos' lead to 24–15. However, the Cardinals went for an unsuccessful two-point conversion, instead of going for the extra point that would have pulled them to within a one-score deficit. The Broncos then proceeded to run out the clock.NotesThe Broncos improved their all-time series record against the Cardinals to 10–1–1, including 6–0 in Denver.

Week 16: at Los Angeles RamsChristmas Day games'''

On Christmas Day, the Broncos traveled to Los Angeles to take on the Rams, who they have not defeated since 2002, when the franchise was based in St. Louis. The Broncos' defense, which had been the lone bright spot throughout the season, displayed their poorest performance, and failed to force a punt or turnover off the Rams, in a 51–14 loss. The Rams jumped out to a 17–0 lead in the first quarter, and the Broncos never recovered, with the Rams taking advantage of two early interceptions by Broncos' quarterback Russell Wilson. Rams' quarterback Baker Mayfield threw two touchdown passes—both to tight end Tyler Higbee, running back Cam Akers rushed for three touchdowns, and cornerback Cobie Durant returned an interception off backup quarterback Brett Rypien 85 yards for a touchdown late in the game. Offensively, the Broncos did not reach the end zone, until midway through the fourth quarter, when Wilson connected on an 11-yard touchdown pass to tight end Greg Dulcich, by which time the game had already been decided in the Rams' favor. The Broncos' surrendered 50+ points for the first time since a 51–23 loss to the Philadelphia Eagles during Week 9 of the 2017 season. The loss also secured the Broncos their third consecutive fourth place finish in the AFC West, marking the first time that the Broncos finished last in their division in 3+ seasons since 1963–1971. The next day, head coach Nathaniel Hackett was fired.

Week 17: at Kansas City Chiefs

The Chiefs took an early lead over the Broncos, with running back Isiah Pacheco rushing for a 5-yard touchdown, coupled with a botched snap on the extra point attempt. The Broncos then took a 10–6 lead, with a 49-yard field goal by placekicker Brandon McManus, followed by quarterback Russell Wilson scrambling for a 16-yard touchdown run. The Chiefs retook the lead just before halftime, with quarterback Patrick Mahomes connecting on a 3-yard touchdown pass to running back Jerick McKinnon just before halftime. The Broncos took a 17–13 lead midway through the third quarter, with Wilson throwing a 25-yard touchdown pass to tight end Albert Okwuegbunam. After forcing a three-and-out, the Broncos were trying to add to their lead; however, a costly pass interference penalty negated a 44-yard pass completion from Wilson to wide receiver Courtland Sutton, forcing the Broncos to punt. The Chiefs went back on top on the first play of the fourth quarter, with Mahomes' second touchdown pass of the game—a 17-yarder to tight end Blake Bell. Following a Wilson interception on the next Broncos' first play from scrimmage, the Chiefs increased their lead to 27–17, with a 3-yard touchdown pass from Mahomes to McKinnon. The Broncos drove down the field, and Wilson ran for a 4-yard touchdown to narrow the Chiefs' lead to 27–24, on a drive that took over six minutes off the clock. The drive was aided by a defensive illegal use of hands penalty on Chiefs' cornerback Joshua Williams that negated an interception of Wilson on a 4th-and-7. After forcing a Chiefs' punt, the Broncos had one last possession with 3:53 remaining in the game. After earning one first down, the Broncos faced a 4th-and-2 from their own 45-yard line with 1:21 remaining; however, Wilson was sacked to end the Broncos' rally attempt. The Broncos' 15th consecutive loss to the Chiefs became the longest losing streak against one opponent in team history, surpassing a 14-game winless skid against the Oakland Raiders from 1965–1971.

Week 18: vs. Los Angeles Chargers

In their finale of what was a difficult 2022 season, the Broncos achieved their highest scoring output against the Chargers, in their only game with 30+ points. After a 17–17 tie at halftime, the Broncos took the lead for good early in the third quarter, with quarterback Russell Wilson throwing a 24-yard touchdown pass to running back Tyler Badie. Wilson threw another touchdown pass to tight end Eric Tomlinson just before halftime, and running back Latavius Murray rushed for another. Defensively, the Broncos surrendered two touchdown passes to Chargers' quarterback Justin Herbert—both in the first half, and after building a 31–20 lead, yielded another to backup quarterback Chase Daniel (plus a successful two-point conversion) to narrow the Broncos' lead to 31–28 at the 6-minute mark of the fourth quarter. The Chargers attempted a rally, but turned the football over on downs on their next possession, and the Broncos ran out the clock. With the win, the Broncos avoided a winless division record and avoided setting a new franchise record for most losses in a season.

Standings

Division

Conference

Statistics

Team leaders

League rankings

Awards and honors

Pro Bowl and All-Pro selections
On December 21, cornerback Patrick Surtain II was named a starter for the 2023 Pro Bowl Games. He is the Broncos' lone representative. Surtain was later named as a first-team All-Pro in the NFL's inaugural All-Pro team on January 11, 2023, and two days later (January 13), safety Justin Simmons was named as a second-team All-Pro.

References

External links
 
 Denver Broncos news, analysis, roster, stats — The Denver Post 
 NFL Nation Blog – ESPN

Denver
Denver Broncos seasons
Denver Broncos
Lewis Hamilton